Tavarua is an island resort in Fiji. It is close to the main Fijian island, Viti Levu, and is surrounded by a coral reef. It is also known to be shaped, somewhat, like a heart.

Background
The resort has surfing, sport fishing, scuba diving, snorkeling and kayaking. There is also a pool, spa, workout facility and tennis court along with a restaurant facility and two bars.

There are seven main surfing breaks on Tavarua: Cloudbreak, Restaurants, Tavarua Rights, Swimming Pools, Namotu Left, Wilkes Pass, and Desperations.  Cloudbreak is a powerful left a mile off the island that breaks over coral reef. 

Tavarua hosts annual professional surfing competitions.

See also

Big wave surfing

References

External links
 Official site

Islands of Fiji
Ba Province
Private islands of Fiji
Mamanuca Islands
Surfing locations